Luther Bingham Nims (March 8, 1837 – December 25, 1918) was an American politician in the state of Washington. He served in the Washington House of Representatives from 1895 to 1897 and 1889 to 1890.

References

1837 births
1918 deaths
Republican Party members of the Washington House of Representatives
19th-century American politicians
People from Chehalis, Washington
People from Grays Harbor County, Washington